Matthew Phillips is a British paraclimber. He competes on the Great Britain Paraclimbing Team, where he was the youngest member, and is the current World Champion in the AU2 (Upper Arm Amputation) category. He is coached by GB Team's Head Coach Robin O'Leary.

Biography 
Phillips was born missing his right lower arm from the elbow down. He started out as a national swimmer, but switched to climbing when he was around 13. He attended Salesian College in Farnborough. He started climbing seriously in 2014. In 2016 he was featured in the Channel 4's Paralympics trailer 'We're the Superhumans'. in 2018 he won the Young Sports Personality of the Year in the Sport Guildford Awards.

He left school in 2019 and spent time in Boulder, Colorado climbing with his coach Robin O'Leary and a number of US climbers. Whilst out there he was joined by film maker David Petts of Volo Digital to film footage for the film 'One of Kind' which is available on Epic TV YouTube channel. Phillips returned to the United Kingdom where he now works as a Climbing Instructor at Surrey Summit, alongside competing.

Filmography 
 July 2016 – We're the Superhumans, television advert produced by Channel 4 for 2016 Summer Paralympics
 May 2018 – At Arms Length, YouTube produced by Teri Limongi
 Dec 2018 – Matthew Phillips Shows Us His Moves At Blokfest Brighton | Climbing Daily Ep.1315, YouTube produced by Epic TV Climbing Daily
 May 2020 – One of a Kind, YouTube produced by David Petts
 Sep 7 2021 – Sport Climbing Caves On The UK Coast, YouTube produced by EpicTV
 Sep 28 2021 – Day in the Life of a Route Setting World Champion, YouTube produced by EpicTV
 Nov 2 2021 – Steep + Powerful: Bouldering At Lulworth Cove, YouTube produced by EpicTV

Competitions 
Phillips has competed in a number of national and international competitions. In 2016 he won the Paraclimbing Cup in June in Italy, and in September in Sheffield. In 2017 he finished second at the Cup in Edinburgh and first at the Cup in Sheffield. In 2018 he won both the Cup in Briançon and the World Championships in Innsbruck.

In the ParaClimb Scotland 2019 Competition Phillips took gold in what is thought to have been the first Para-Speed Climbing event, on an international approved speed wall, in the United Kingdom with a time of 25.36s. Although his personal best came on the first qualifying route at 23.11s.

In 2019 he successfully defended his world title by winning a gold medal at the World Paraclimbing Championships in Briançon in France. He became Three times World Paraclimbing Champion in 2021 when he won Gold in Moscow

References

External links
 IFSC Profile
 8a.nu Profile
 Website
 Instagram
 Twitter
UKC Logbook

Living people
2000 births
British rock climbers
British disabled sportspeople
Paraclimbers
English people with disabilities
Sportspeople from Guildford
English amputees
People educated at Salesian College, Farnborough